Jean-Marc Zvellenreuther (born 26 October 1967) is a French classical guitarist.

Life 
Guitarist, teacher, and conductor, Zvellenreuther followed Alberto Ponce's teaching at the École Normale de Musique de Paris, before becoming his assistant at the Conservatoire de Paris. The Spanish master passed on the secrets of his art to him, perpetuating the tradition of Francisco Tárrega and Emilio Pujol.

1st prize in the 1988 Carpentras International Guitar Competition, he is the winner of the international competitions in San Rémo (Italy), Printemps de la guitare (Belgium) and Ségovia (Spain), among others.

A founding member, with Florentino Calvo, of the Polycord Trio, Zvellenreuther regularly performs at the Paris Opera, with the orchestras of Radio France, with the Ensemble Intercontemporain, etc.

Discography 
 Isaac Albeniz' Iberia (LFM)
 Novecento pianist by A. Baricco, music by Alexandros Markeas
 Folias for guitar (LFM)
 Impressions d’Espagne (Triton)
 Trio Polycordes volume 1 (LFM)
 Trio Polycordes volume 2 (LFM)
 Trio Polycordes volume 3 (LFM)
 In memoriam Frédérick Martin, Trio Polycordes (LFM)
 Complete Emilio Pujol's work (collective work)
 Petite géographie sentimentale de la banquise (improvised music, LFM)
 Berlioz's Sérénade de Méphistophélès, with Roberto Alagna (EMI)
 Magdalena Kozena's French Arias (DGG)
 Florentino Calvo's Portraits en forme de miroir (LFM)

References

External links 
 Official website
 Selected discography (Discogs)
 Sarabande, J.-S. Bach, Jean-Marc Zvellenreuther, guitar (YouTube)

1967 births
Living people
École Normale de Musique de Paris alumni
French classical guitarists
French male guitarists
20th-century French musicians
21st-century French musicians
French music educators
20th-century French male musicians
21st-century French male musicians